There but for Fortune may refer to:

 There but for Fortune (album), a 1989 Phil Ochs album
 "There but for Fortune" (song), a 1964 song written by Phil Ochs
 Phil Ochs: There but for Fortune, a 2011 documentary film